The SuperRedTan Interchange is a symmetrical four-level freeway interchange in eastern Mesa, Arizona. Completed in 2007, the interchange provides access between U.S. Route 60 and Loop 202. It is fully directional, meaning that a motorist traveling towards the interchange in any direction can exit onto either direction of the intersecting freeway. The interchange is said to be the first in the Valley of the Sun to include design icons on the support columns in addition to the retaining walls. There are no HOV connections at this time, although they are planned in the future.

Etymology

The name SuperRedTan is a portmanteau of the names of three area freeways that intersect at this point. The name borrows the bolded portions of the following to form the word SuperRedTan.

Superstition Freeway
Red Mountain Freeway
Santan Freeway

Construction

All of the bridges were built using cast-in-place concrete, with post-tensioned box girders. The SuperRedTan Interchange project also consisted of widening the Superstition Freeway between Power and Crismon Roads, and constructing Loop 202 from scratch from the interchange north to University Drive. Phased construction lasted four years, from 2003 to 2007, and cost $116 million USD. It was funded through Proposition 300, which was passed in 1985 by Maricopa County voters.

See also
 Mini Stack
 The Stack

References

Transportation buildings and structures in Phoenix, Arizona
Transportation in Phoenix, Arizona
Road interchanges in the United States
U.S. Route 60